A Mother's Revenge (aka Desperate Justice) is a 1993 American film starring Lesley Ann Warren, Bruce Davison, and Shirley Knight. The teleplay adaptation was written by John Bensink .

It was based on the novel (published:1989) of the same name by Richard Speight from Nashville, Tennessee (father of American actor Richard Speight, Jr.). The original novel may have been based on true story, as Speight was a Tennessean criminal attorney. According to Barnes & Noble author information, "He (Speight) taught trial law at Vanderbilt University for 14 years, and was a Writer in Residence at Belmont University for five years."

Plot
The film opens with Arizona housewife and mother Carol Sanders enjoying a morning run through the neighborhood with her 12-year-old daughter, Wendy. As they return, Carol's husband Bill reveals that he's managed to land an important business deal, though the happy mood is cut short after realizing that the couple's rebellious teenage daughter, Jill, has overslept again. Wendy offers to wake her, but a minor argument ensues between the two sisters after she does so, though Carol quickly defuses it.

Later that day, Carol must cover for a co-member of her women's club and host a club luncheon; however, the luncheon runs late, leaving her unable to pick up Wendy (who's staying after school to work on a science project). Since Bill is in Los Angeles for a meeting concerning his aforementioned business deal, Carol calls Jill at the record store where she works and asks her to pick Wendy up, but Jill inadvertently forgets about it until 10 minutes after she was supposed to be at Wendy's school.

However, once on the road, Jill runs into a traffic jam and doesn't get there until much later. Not finding Wendy anywhere on the school grounds, she hurries home and tells her parents the news; Bill returns to the school with her, but they are still unable to find Wendy, and the police are called, who soon discover the presence of blood and suspect it might be hers.

Unable to sleep that night, Bill and Carol receive a visit from one of the detectives on the case, who found Wendy on the side of the road after being raped and badly beaten, which left her in a coma. She is brought to the local hospital's ICU while the police try to determine if the crime was committed by a school faculty member or a stranger. A tearful Jill says she feels like what happened was her fault, but Bill assures her that is not the case.

Two days later, a suspect is arrested: Frank Warden, the janitor at Wendy's school. As it turns out, Frank had two molestation charges in California, but they did not show up on his background check. While detectives assure Bill that they have a slam-dunk case, a number of discrepancies soon come to the surface in court, culminating in a solid alibi from Frank's mother, Bess, who testifies that her son was dining with her in a restaurant when the crime occurred, and the case is dismissed as a result. Seeing Frank smiling and laughing about the decision, a grief-stricken Carol suddenly snaps, pulls out a gun, and shoots Frank in open court, critically wounding him.

After Carol is released on bail following her arrest, Wendy emerges from her coma, though a doctor reveals that it will take time for her to recall the traumatic events she went through, and that she'll need support from her family and psychiatric help. In the meantime, Carol attempts to secure a defense attorney and approaches Ellen Wells, who had represented Frank Warden, but she is unable to do so, as Frank is still alive.

Desperate for assistance, Carol then tries to approach Frank's mother, but Bess angrily turns her away, revealing that Frank died in the hospital an hour earlier. Later that day, a tearful Wendy has suddenly learned about everything her mother has been through, along with her own ordeal (as Jill had filled her in), and in an emotional scene, Carol does her best to help her understand. However, this decision later sets off an argument between Jill and Carol, during which Jill accuses Carol of blaming her for what happened to Wendy and wishing it had happened to her instead.

Now having managed to secure Wells' service, the two prepare for Carol's case, but the unexpected twists and turns soon complicate things. To top it off, Carol returns home to find Jill and her boyfriend Brian making out in his car, and after Carol makes a scene about it, another argument ensues. Angrily, Jill repeats her earlier claim that Carol blames her for Wendy's ordeal, as well as not having any time for her, culminating in Jill storming out of the house.

By the next morning, Jill has still not returned home, causing Carol to miss her first court appearance, much to the presiding judge's annoyance. Finally, she finds Jill sitting by Wendy's hospital bed, and the two have a heart-to-heart talk where Carol admits that Jill was right: despite Carol's repeated denials, in trying to blame someone because of her overwhelming pain, she unfairly scapegoated Jill because she didn't want to blame herself.

However, Jill now sees the validity in what Bill told her earlier, and assures her mother that none of them are at fault. A short time later, Wendy has finally come home and the family has a "welcome home" party in her honor, but she admits to Jill that she's feeling "scared" and "different" from her family and friends, and wonders if they'll still like her. Jill assures Wendy that not only will they still like her, they'll like her more for the strength and courage she showed the whole time. Satisfied, she emerges from the house with Jill, and is warmly received by their family and the invited guests.

Not long after Wendy comes home, the trial finally begins, with Carol attempting to prove that she had lost control of herself in the moment she shot Frank Warden. However, the jury ultimately returns a guilty verdict on the charge of manslaughter, and a sentencing date is set for two weeks later, but realizing that any further strain would not be good for Carol or the family, Wells makes a motion for a more immediate sentence, which is granted, and the date is moved up to the following day.

Just before the sentence can be handed down the next day, a voice from the gallery requests to address the court: Bess Warden, who admits to having provided a false alibi for her son at his original trial, thinking the courts could prove Frank's crime without her help. Realizing everything Wendy has been through, and knowing jail time will neither bring back her son nor make what he did to Wendy go away, she asks for leniency in Carol's sentencing. Moved by her statement, the judge reduces his originally planned 6-year sentence to just three years (which can be reduced to two for good behavior), and also grants weekend visitation rights to Carol's family.

Cast
 Lesley Ann Warren as Carol Sanders
 Bruce Davison as Bill Sanders
 Shirley Knight as Bess Warden
 Missy Crider as Jill Sanders
 Allison Mack as Wendy Sanders
 David Byron as Frank Warden
 Annette O'Toole as Ellen Wells

DVD release
Desperate Justice was released on DVD in the UK on 8 October 2001.

Although the film never received a DVD release in the United States, it has been frequently seen on both Lifetime and sister channel Lifetime Movie Network since its original airing.

In 2014, a theatrical adaptation of the film/novel was produced in Japan by Gekidan Touhai production.

References

External links
 Amazon 
 

1993 television films
1993 crime drama films
American crime drama films
Films based on American novels
Films directed by Armand Mastroianni
Films set in Arizona
American rape and revenge films
1993 films
American drama television films
1990s English-language films
1990s American films